Ligma may refer to: 
 Lesbian and Gay Men's Association (LIGMA), an association in Croatia supporting LGBT rights, 1992–1997
 "Ligma", a song by Magnetic Man
 Rahul Ligma, a fictional ex-employee of Twitter
 Ligma Corporation, an automobile manufacturer in Nashville, Illinois, part of Grupo Antolin

See also
 LIGNA, a woodworking trade fair